Networks and States: The Global Politics of Internet Governance is a 2010 book by Professor at the Syracuse University School of Information Studies Milton L. Muller. This book shows an influence of networks on the government.

Synopsis
 Chapter I, Networks and Governance
 Chapter II, Transnational Institutions
 Chapter III, Drivers of Internet Governance

Sources 

Internet governance
Books about the Internet
2010 non-fiction books